The school rivalry between Ateneo de Manila University and De La Salle University began when both educational institutions participated in the National Collegiate Athletic Association of the Philippines (NCAA) and has carried over to the University Athletic Association of the Philippines (UAAP) where both universities compete in currently. Before UAAP Season 84, the Ateneo men's varsity team was known as the Ateneo Blue Eagles, the women's varsity team as the Ateneo Lady Eagles, and the high school team as the Ateneo Blue Eaglets. In May 2022, Ateneo de Manila University decided to unify student-athletes and varsity teams under the "Blue Eagles" moniker, regardless of sport, gender, or age group.

The La Salle men's varsity team is known as the De La Salle Green Archers, women's varsity team as the De La Salle Lady Archers, and high school team as the De La Salle Zobel Junior Archers. Ateneo and La Salle were both co-founders of the NCAA in 1924, until Ateneo left the league in 1978 to join the UAAP while La Salle announced its decision to leave the NCAA in September 1980. Both Catholic private schools in the Metro Manila area have been competing against each other in the UAAP ever since La Salle was also admitted to join the league in 1986.

History
The rivalry began in 1939 when Ateneo lost to La Salle in a hotly contested championship basketball game in NCAA Season 16 (1939–40). Basketball games between Ateneo and La Salle in the old NCAA were always hard-fought but were not yet tagged by the local sportswriters as a recognized rivalry. The more popular collegiate sports rivalries in the NCAA were Ateneo versus San Beda and La Salle versus Letran. When Ateneo and La Salle transferred to the UAAP in 1978 and 1986 respectively, they naturally continued their fierce battles and innate animosity against each other on and off-court, and the sports press began to recognize the rivalry. The rivalry started in the pre-war NCAA with the men's basketball, football, and track, and field competitions and has since expanded to other UAAP sports, particularly in women's volleyball where both teams fought head-to-head in the UAAP Finals for six consecutive times from 2012 to 2017. Both universities have also extended their rivalry beyond sports and have gone into academic competitions. From 1924 to 1925, basketball games between Ateneo and La Salle were played at an open basketball court at the Padre Faura, Ermita campus of UP, and in 1926 at the Nozaleda Park (now called Agrifina Circle which is part of Luneta Park). The venue later moved to the covered courts of the US Army's 31st Infantry Gym and UST Gym. The games then moved to the pre-war Rizal Memorial Coliseum to accommodate bigger crowds, and at one point, the venues included the Ateneo Loyola Center, the Cuneta Astrodome, and the PhilSports Arena. Currently, the Smart Araneta Coliseum and the SM Mall of Asia Arena are the present main venues for their sold-out games.

Head-to-head records by sport

Seniors' division
Presently, La Salle has more collegiate championships compared to Ateneo in the NCAA and UAAP combined, in both men's and women's divisions. La Salle has 184 collegiate titles versus Ateneo with 113 collegiate titles. La Salle also has eight General Collegiate Championships versus Ateneo with one General Collegiate Championship. This count excludes additional collegiate titles and the five General Collegiate Championships also won by De La Salle–College of Saint Benilde since it participated in the NCAA in 1998.

La Salle leads Ateneo 11–6 in 17 of the 19 sports categories where both teams compete in currently. Note that both teams are tied with the number of titles for beach volleyball with one each, and both teams have yet to win collegiate championships in Cheerdance.

 3x3 Basketball –  Ateneo (1) – La Salle (none)
 Badminton –       Ateneo (12) – La Salle (6)
 Baseball –        Ateneo (6) – La Salle (5) 
 Basketball –      Ateneo (28) – La Salle (19)
 Beach Volleyball – Ateneo (1) – La Salle (1)
 Cheerdance –      Ateneo (none) – La Salle (none)
 Chess –           La Salle (16) – Ateneo (6)
 Fencing –         Ateneo (2) – La Salle (none)
 Football –        La Salle (36) – Ateneo (14)
 Judo –            Ateneo (8) – La Salle (2)
 Poomsae –         La Salle (3) – Ateneo (none)
 Softball –        La Salle (3) – Ateneo (1)
 Street dance –    La Salle (4) – Ateneo (none)
 Swimming –        La Salle (17) – Ateneo (14)
 Table tennis –    La Salle (12) – Ateneo (none)
 Taekwondo –       La Salle (9) – Ateneo (none)
 Tennis –          La Salle (20) – Ateneo (2)
 Track and field – La Salle (13) – Ateneo (9)
 Volleyball –      La Salle (18) – Ateneo (9)

General (Overall) Championships
La Salle leads Ateneo in the number of General Championships in the seniors' division, 8–1. Note that all championships listed are NCAA General Championships and UAAP General Championships. La Salle won its first UAAP General Championship in the seniors' division in UAAP Season 75 (2012–13), and won two additional General Championship titles in UAAP Season 76 (2013–14), and UAAP Season 78 (2015–16).

 La Salle (8) – (5) NCAA: 1972–73, 1974–75, 1976–77, 1977–78, 1980–81; (3) UAAP: 2012–13, 2013–14, 2015–16
 Ateneo (1) – NCAA: 1968–69

Juniors' division
Presently, Ateneo has 116 titles while La Salle has 120 titles. La Salle's juniors' team was represented first by DLSC High School from 1924 to 1968, followed by La Salle Green Hills (LSGH) from 1969 to 1981, and currently De La Salle Zobel (DLSZ) since 1986. La Salle has 10 General High School Championship titles versus Ateneo with four General High School Championships titles. This count excludes the additional high school titles and the four General High School Championships won by La Salle Green Hills after it began to represent De La Salle–College of Saint Benilde in the NCAA Juniors division in 1998.

Ateneo leads La Salle 7–6 in 13 of the 14 sports categories where both teams compete in currently.

 Baseball –        Ateneo (5) – La Salle (4) 
 Basketball –      Ateneo (30) – La Salle (8)
 Beach Volleyball – Ateneo (none) – La Salle (none)
 Chess –           Ateneo (7) – La Salle (4)
 Fencing –         Ateneo (2) – La Salle (none)
 Football –        La Salle (31) – Ateneo (5)
 Judo –            Ateneo (9) – La Salle (none)
 Softball –        La Salle (8) – Ateneo (2)
 Swimming –        La Salle (13) – Ateneo (12)
 Table tennis –    La Salle (5) – Ateneo (1)
 Taekwondo –       Ateneo (3) – La Salle (none)
 Tennis –          La Salle (9) – Ateneo (none)
 Track and field – Ateneo (34) – La Salle (14)
 Volleyball –      La Salle (24) – Ateneo (6)

General (Overall) Championships
La Salle leads Ateneo in General High School Championship titles, 10–4. The first two General High School Championship titles of La Salle were won by DLSC High School while the next eight titles were won by La Salle Green Hills. Note that included are NCAA and UAAP General Championships.

 La Salle (10) – NCAA: 1965–66, 1966–67 (DLSC High School), 1971–72, 1973–74, 1974–75, 1975–76, 1977–78, 1978–79, 1979–80, 1980–81 (LSGH)
 Ateneo (4) – (2) NCAA: 1967–68, 1976–77; (2) UAAP: 2000–01, 2001–02

Basketball

Overall
In terms of total collegiate and high school basketball titles won in the NCAA and UAAP, Ateneo leads La Salle, 58–27. In men's basketball, Ateneo has a total of 26 championship titles whereas La Salle has 14. The Blue Eagles have 14 NCAA titles and 12 UAAP titles while the Green Archers have 5 NCAA titles and 9 UAAP titles. In juniors' basketball, Ateneo has 11 NCAA titles and 19 UAAP titles, for a total of 30, whereas La Salle has 6 NCAA titles and 2 UAAP titles, for 8 in total. In women's basketball, both schools have only won titles in the UAAP as the NCAA does not have a women's basketball tournament, where La Salle leads Ateneo, 5–2.

The Ateneo Blue Eagles and the De La Salle Green Archers have met in the championships of the NCAA and UAAP at least nine (9) times. The Blue Eagles won the men's basketball title over La Salle in 1958, 1988, 2002, 2008, and 2017 whereas the Green Archers prevailed in 1939, 1974, 2001, and 2016.

In the juniors' division, the De La Salle Junior Archers defeated the top-seeded Ateneo Blue Eaglets in 2007. In 2009, the Eaglets defeated the top-seeded Junior Archers.

Collegiate titles of national scope
In terms of collegiate titles of national scope, Ateneo leads with five titles to La Salle's three. Ateneo won the Collegiate Champions League (CCL) title in 2007, and won back to back titles in the Philippine Collegiate Championship League (PCCL) in the 2009 and 2010 seasons, as well as in the 2018 and 2019 seasons. La Salle won the Philippine Intercollegiate Championship in 1988 and the Philippine Collegiate Championship in 2008 and 2013 against Ateneo and the SWU Cobras, respectively.

Ateneo won the 2007 Collegiate Champions League title against the University of the Visayas Green Lancers, 71–54. The Collegiate Champions League (CCL), was then reformatted and became the Philippine Collegiate Championship League (PCCL). It is currently the national collegiate basketball championship tournament, sanctioned by the Samahang Basketbol ng Pilipinas, the country's official basketball federation. College teams from all over the country participate in the tournament. The tournament also has a Sweet 16 similar to the United States' NCAA basketball tournament during "March Madness."

The Green Archers won the 2008 PCCL title. La Salle defeated the second-seeded NCAA champion San Beda Red Lions and arranged a finals meeting with the top-seeded UAAP champion Ateneo Blue Eagles, who defeated the Letran Knights in the Final Four. In the championship match, the De La Salle Green Archers prevailed over the Ateneo Blue Eagles, 71–62.

In the 2009 season of the Philippine Collegiate Championship League, the Blue Eagles defeated the FEU Tamaraws in three games to clinch their second national title, whereas the Green Archers were eliminated by the Letran Knights in their first game in the round of 16. In the 2010 season, the Blue Eagles defeated the Adamson Falcons in three games to clinch their third and back-to-back national titles, while the Green Archers settled for 3rd-place beating the UC Webmasters despite having 4 players injured and only 10 players intact in the line-up.

In the 2013 season of the Philippine Collegiate Championship League, the Green Archers defeated the South Western University Cobras, via sweep to reclaim the national championship for the first time since 2008 and winning their second title in the tournament.

In the 2018 season of the Philippine Collegiate Championship League, the Blue Eagles defeated the University of the Visayas Green Lancers, 95–71 to reclaim the national championship for the first time since 2010 and winning their fourth title in the tournament. In the 2019 season, the Blue Eagles defeated the San Beda Red Lions 57–46 to win their fifth title in the PCCL.

Championship streaks
Ateneo was 3-peat NCAA champion from 1931 through 1933, and its record of 14 collegiate titles remained unsurpassed by any school in the NCAA until 2003. They currently hold the distinction of having the longest UAAP basketball title streak in the Final Four era after winning five straight times from 2008 to 2012. In 2019, Ateneo achieved another 3-peat and became the first team in the UAAP Final Four era to finish an entire season (including the finals) without a single loss (16–0) in the UAAP Season 82 men's basketball tournament.

Both schools have also managed to post what are regarded as "double championships" by winning both the seniors and juniors titles in the same year. The Ateneo Blue Eagles still have the most number of double titles in NCAA history, with four double championships, including the NCAA's second back-to-back double championships in 1975 and 1976 (the first was accomplished by the University of the Philippines in 1925 and 1926).

Ateneo holds the distinction of being the only double 3-peat champion in the senior and junior levels whether in the NCAA or UAAP, from 2008 to 2010, and has posted two 4-peats and three back-to-back title streaks in the UAAP juniors' division.

La Salle does not have any such streaks in the NCAA, but won back-to-back titles once in 1989 and 1990, and also posted a rare 4-peat in UAAP men's basketball from 1998 to 2001. La Salle accomplished the double championship once during its stint in the NCAA (1939) and UAAP (2007).

The Lady Archers were able to duplicate the championship streak of the Green Archers and achieved a 4-peat of their own from 1999 to 2002, which was the longest UAAP women's basketball championship streak in the Final Four era until it was surpassed by the NU Lady Bulldogs when they won six straight championships from 2014 to 2019.

La Salle holds the distinction of being the first and only school to be 3-peat UAAP basketball champions in both men's and women's divisions in the same period, from 1999 to 2001. In 2013, La Salle were champions in both divisions again in the UAAP Season 76 basketball tournaments.

NCAA
In 1939, La Salle defeated Ateneo in both the Seniors and Juniors NCAA Championship. The school rivalry reputedly started that year when after La Salle defeated Ateneo, then the defending champions, Lasallites challenged Ateneans by throwing fried chicken outside the gates of the pre-war Ateneo Padre Faura campus in Manila. Ateneo and La Salle would not meet in the championship again until 1958 where Ateneo defeated La Salle by a basket in overtime. Another finals meeting of both schools took place in 1974 with La Salle prevailing over Ateneo in the championship. Ateneo and La Salle left the NCAA in 1978 and 1981 respectively after games turned into full-blown riots, with Ateneo leaving after losing the 1978 championship against San Beda in closed doors, and La Salle after fan disturbance in their 1980 second-round game against Letran.

UAAP
1988: First Ateneo–La Salle finals in the UAAP

In 1988, Ateneo and La Salle met in their first finals match since 1974 when both teams still competed in the NCAA. Ateneo won, 76–70 at the Rizal Memorial Coliseum. Ateneo was led by Gilbert Reyes under head coach Fritz Gaston, while La Salle was led by Dindo Pumaren under head coach and older brother Derrick Pumaren. La Salle would win their first basketball championship in the UAAP the following year in Season 52, while Ateneo would not win another title until 14 years later in Season 65.

2001: La Salle secures fourth straight title

La Salle was the defending three-time champion, while Ateneo were in a 13-year championship drought. La Salle won the game. At Game 2, Enrico Villanueva scored 22 points to lead the Eagles to a series-extending win. After Mike Cortez tying the game at 72–all, Villanueva passed the ball to teammate Magnum Membrere who scored a three-pointer. On the next possession, Ren-Ren Ritualo failed to answer with a game-tying three of his own to force a sudden-death Game 3, scoring Ateneo's first win against La Salle in the season after three games. In the deciding game, Carlo Sharma scored a UAAP career-high 22 points, 11 in the final quarter to prevent an Ateneo victory. Ateneo's rookie LA Tenorio had 30 points of his own but it was not enough, as La Salle coach Pumaren remarked that "This was the sweetest of the four championships because we're able to erase the stigma of our 1988 loss to Ateneo."

2002: 14-year Ateneo championship drought is over

Prior to the Finals, Ateneo prevented a 14–0 elimination round sweep of La Salle that would have given a bye up to the best-of-three Finals. Instead, Ateneo defeated La Salle in the elimination round finale 76–63. La Salle defeated rival University of Santo Tomas (UST), and Ateneo overcame No. 2 seed University of the East  (UE) in two games, with the second game ending in a buzzer beater by Gec Chia to push Ateneo into the Finals anew.

Game 1 ended with Villanueva scoring Ateneo's last ten points, and teammate Larry Fonacier blocking two shots by Mark Cardona that would have forced overtime to give Ateneo a 1–0 series lead. In Game 2, with the Ateneo team noted as being "tense," La Salle had an 18-point lead at halftime, which Ateneo cut down to three, 80–77, but Sharma and Adonis Santa Maria converted crucial free-throws that gave La Salle enough breathing space to force another Game 3. In Game 3, La Salle player Mike Cortez missed 11 of 13 shots, which caused La Salle students and alumni to accuse him of throwing the game, as Ateneo eventually won the title to deny La Salle a fifth consecutive championship.

2003–2005: Semifinals meetings

Ateneo and La Salle would play second fiddle to Far Eastern University (FEU) from 2003 to 2005, with the Tamaraws defeating Ateneo in 2003, losing to La Salle in 2004 and defeating La Salle in 2005.

Along the way, the two teams met in the semifinals, where the higher seed gets the twice-to-beat advantage. In 2003, La Salle forced No. 1 seed Ateneo into a rubber match after a 76–72 overtime win, with the game being halted after a brawl erupted between the two teams. With Ateneo's LA Tenorio and La Salle's Ryan Araña suspended for the deciding game, Ateneo eliminated La Salle from Finals contention in the deciding game with a 74–68 triumph.

In 2004, La Salle and Ateneo finished the elimination round tied for second place, so a playoff game was played to determine which team gets the twice-to-beat advantage. La Salle won the game, and ended Ateneo's season in the semifinals, to face FEU in the Finals. La Salle would win in three games to deny FEU which had defeated Ateneo a season before, a back-to-back championship run.

In 2005, three teams, La Salle, Ateneo and UE, were all tied for second place. La Salle won the tiebreaker with a superior point differential on games played by the three teams, causing Ateneo and UE to play for the right to face La Salle with the twice-to-win disadvantage in which the Eagles won. However, La Salle defeated Ateneo in the semifinals to clinch another Finals appearance against FEU.

2006: La Salle suspension

After FEU swept La Salle in the 2005 championship series, La Salle admitted it fielded two ineligible players from 2003 to 2005, albeit it claimed not to be aware of their ineligibility which caused them to return the 2005 runner-up trophy and the 2004 championship trophy they won against FEU (the league would later award FEU the trophy). The league suspended La Salle in 2006 for a year due to negligence, with all of their games during that period also forfeited. Ateneo faced UST in the 2006 Finals, a series UST won in three games.

2007: "Two is Greater than Three"

Upon their return in 2007, UE swept the elimination round 14–0, with their last game against La Salle going into overtime with the Warriors still prevailing. With Ateneo also losing their last game, the two teams were again tied for second place, and La Salle won the playoff game to clinch the twice-to-beat advantage. Prior to this, Ateneo won the two elimination round games against La Salle.

Unlike earlier match-ups where the team with the advantage won the first game, Ateneo won the first game, with Chris Tiu playing pivotal roles in crunch time where he scored the winning lay-up with 7.3 seconds remaining to force a deciding game. In their fifth meeting of the season, Pocholo Villanueva scored a three-pointer to add La Salle's lead to nine with less than three minutes in the game left. After an Ateneo 6–2 run, Villanueva scored a jump-shot anew, padding the lead to seven. After Ford Arao later cut the lead to five, La Salle's OJ Cua missed two free-throws with 23.9 seconds remaining. Chris Tiu passed the ball to Nonoy Baclao who scored a three-pointer to cut the lead to two, but JV Casio converted both of his free-throws with 4 seconds left to punch La Salle's ticket to the Finals. This had been the only time Ateneo and La Salle played for five games in a season without both the teams advancing to the Finals.

La Salle would eventually sweep UE in the Finals 2–0 to cap their seventh men's basketball championship. After the season, La Salle coach Franz Pumaren remarked that "This is the only time that two is greater than three, they beat us three times, but we beat them when it counted the most."

2008–2012: Ateneo wins five straight titles

Ateneo would later claim their fourth UAAP title in 2008 against defending champions La Salle by sweeping the finals series 2–0. In Game 1, Rabeh Al-Hussaini scored 31 points to lead Ateneo to a win. In Game 2, Ateneo led by 15 points at halftime, but La Salle rallied to cut the lead down to 50–47 at the end of the third quarter. However, La Salle forward Rico Maierhofer was ejected just before the end of the quarter after the officials said that he flashed the dirty finger. Maierhofer denied the charge and revealed nine years later in 2017 that he was actually signaling for a La Salle teammate to switch places. La Salle suffered a scoring drought which saw the lead balloon to eight in the last two minutes, and Ateneo never looked back after a Jai Reyes three-point play to secure Ateneo's fourth UAAP men's basketball title.

La Salle paraded several rookies for the 2009 season, while Ateneo emerged with only Chris Tiu as the major graduating player. With these conditions, the first Ateneo–La Salle game came at the heels of former President Corazon Aquino's death, and as a result, spectators wore yellow as a sign for respect for Aquino. Ateneo outlasted La Salle in overtime to end the first round with a solitary loss. The two teams met a week later, but this time Ateneo had a big enough lead to prevent La Salle from catching up. Ateneo qualified for the semifinals as the No. 1 seed, eventually winning the championship; La Salle missed out on the Final Four on the final day after being defeated by NU. The 2009 season would be the first time Ateneo and La Salle would not meet in the playoffs since 2001, not including their Finals encounter in 2008 and the DLSU suspension in 2006.

In 2010, parading some new players and an improved set of veterans, the Green Archers defeated the Blue Eagles, 66–63, with the Blue Eagles still feeling the loss of three of the previous season's starters and sophomore guard Sam Marata shooting hot in the end game. This was the first official win of the Green Archers against the Blue Eagles in UAAP action since 2007.  In the second round encounter, the Ateneo Blue Eagles were threatened with falling into a tie in the standings had they lost to DLSU. After falling behind 4–9, the Blue Eagles went on a 10–0 scoring run to take a double digit lead, and went on to defeat the Archers decisively, 74–57.

2010 was the second straight year that Ateneo and DLSU would not meet in a post eliminations series. DLSU managed to reach the Final Four after missing it in the previous season, but fell to the top-seeded FEU Tamaraws in overtime. The Blue Eagles defeated the Adamson Falcons in the Final Four, and went on to sweep the Tamaraws for their third consecutive title despite not having any player in the Mythical Team.

In 2011, the Ateneo Blue Eagles team headlined by two rookies defeated DLSU again in both of their elimination matches. It is also the third straight year that Ateneo and DLSU would not meet in a post elimination series, since the DLSU Green Archers failed to qualify once again for the Final Four. The Ateneo Blue Eagles were the top-seeded team in the semifinals and defeated the UST Growling Tigers in one game. The Blue Eagles then proceeded to sweep the Finals series against the FEU Tamaraws, thus achieving its own four-peat.

Prior to the start of the 2012 season, Norman Black announced that this would be his last season as head coach of the Ateneo. La Salle, on the other hand, had a rookie coach in Gee Abanilla. The two schools met thrice that season – twice in the elimination and once in the semi-finals with Ateneo winning all of the games. A few days prior to the Final 4 match between Ateneo and La Salle, the Blue Eagle's patron, Manny Pangilinan, announced that he would be pulling out his support from the school. Despite the controversy, Ateneo eventually won its fifth consecutive title, sweeping UST in the Finals.

2013: La Salle reclaims championship

Upon the departure of Norman Black, Dolreich "Bo" Perasol, a former member of the University of the Philippines men's basketball team and a seasoned Philippine Basketball Association head coach, was tapped by Ateneo as head coach of the Blue Eagles. The entry of Perasol, who was rumored to be tapped as team consultant of the UP Fighting Maroons prior to his appointment as Ateneo head coach, also heralded the return of Manny Pangilinan as the Blue Eagles' main patron. Joining Ateneo men's basketball team was Filipino-American forward Chris Newsome.

Over at La Salle, a series of reshuffles within and outside of the team resulted to the appointment of then assistant coach Juno Sauler as the head coach of the Green Archers. Joining the De La Salle Green Archers coaching staff prior to the start of the 2013–2014 UAAP season was Allan Caidic, who took on the chores of shooting coach. Filipino-American forwards Jason Perkins and Matthew Salem became a part of team roster, which had to adjust to the loss of resident players Yutien Andrada, Mac Tallo, Fonzo Gotladera and Papot Paredes.

For the first time since 2005, La Salle was able to sweep Ateneo during the elimination round. During their first round meeting at the Mall of Asia Arena last July 7, 2013, the Green Archers, banking on the heroics of combo guard Almond Vosotros and center Arnold Van Opstal, defeated the Blue Eagles, 82–73, resulting to Ateneo's third straight loss to start the season. The second round meeting, which was held at the Araneta Coliseum last September 1, 2013, was tightly contested by Ateneo and La Salle, with the Green Archers winning over the Blue Eagles, 66–64, after sophomore forward Jeron Teng sank a floater with only two seconds left in the shot clock.

Toward the end of the second round Ateneo-La Salle game, Perasol was involved in a scuffle with JJ Atayde, an alumnus of La Salle, after the former got irked with the latter's heckling. The incident caused the UAAP Board to penalize Perasol with a one-game suspension and Atayde with a season-wide ban from watching games. Controversy further ensued after Perasol violated his one-game suspension by watching from inside the Ateneo dugout during the Blue Eagles' September 8, 2013 game against the UE Red Warriors, forcing UE team officials to file an inquiry before the UAAP Board. The UAAP Board acted on UE's request for an inquiry, ordering Perasol to serve his one-game suspension during Ateneo's September 18, 2013 game against the UST Growling Tigers.

Ateneo, with Perasol serving his one-game suspension, was eventually defeated by UST, 74–82, causing the Blue Eagles to not only be dethroned as UAAP Men's Basketball Champions after five straight seasons but to also miss Final Four contention for the first time since 1998.

La Salle, after a disappointing 3–4 finish during the first round of elimination games, swept the second round and ended the elimination round at 10–4, forcing a three-way tie for the top spot alongside the NU Bulldogs and the FEU Tamaraws. Due to having the highest quotient, NU took the Number One spot with twice-to-beat advantage and faced UST in the Final Four, with the Growling Tigers defeating the Bulldogs in two games. On the other hand, La Salle and FEU faced each other twice, the first meeting being a rubber match game for the Number Two spot and the twice-to-beat advantage and the second being the formal Final Four game, with the Green Archers winning on both occasions and entering the Finals for the first time since UAAP Season 71. During the finals series, La Salle defeated UST in three games to win the UAAP Season 76 men's basketball championship title.

2016: Green Archers unleash "Mayhem"

Both Ateneo and La Salle were unable to reach the UAAP Men's Basketball Finals in 2014 and 2015. By 2016, La Salle was able to utilize center Ben Mbala, and tapped the services of former Letran Knights coach Aldin Ayo while Ateneo was on a rebuilding stage after the graduation of their top two scorers in Kiefer Ravena and Von Pessumal though they were able to get the services of former Gilas Pilipinas coach Tab Baldwin. Under coach Ayo, La Salle adopted a defense-oriented system with emphasis on fast breaks and the use of full-court press which Ayo called "Mayhem". The Green Archers finished the elimination round as the top seed with a 13–1 record with Ateneo coming in second with a 10–4 win–loss record. The only loss of the Green Archers came at the hands of their archivals, the Ateneo Blue Eagles during the second to the last game of the elimination round. Coming into Final Four both teams have a twice-to-beat advantage with La Salle defeating Adamson in just one game while Ateneo had to utilize their twice-to-beat incentives against FEU. After eight years, Ateneo and La Salle faced off in the Finals, with La Salle emerging as the champion of Season 79 after sweeping Ateneo in the Finals.

2017–2019: Blue Eagles win three consecutive championships

The following year, in Season 80, the Ateneo Blue Eagles won their first 13 games of the elimination round. Their bid for a sweep was denied by the De La Salle Green Archers. In the Final Four matches, La Salle went on to defeat the Adamson Falcons, while the Blue Eagles lost the first game to the FEU Tamaraws, their second loss of the season. Ateneo prevailed over FEU in the decider and faced La Salle in the championship series. The Blue Eagles took Game One, 76–70, whereas the Green Archers rallied from 21 points down to take Game 2, 92–83. In Game 3, the Blue Eagles led by as much as 10 points in order to defeat La Salle, 88–86, and retake the men's basketball championship. 

Season 80 would eventually become the first of three consecutive championships (all against La Salle, UP and UST, respectively) for Ateneo up to UAAP Season 82 (the first championship round between the #1 and #4-seeded men's basketball teams, and the first 16-0 season sweep, in UAAP history), anchored by Thirdy Ravena, the first collegiate player in UAAP history to win three consecutive Finals Most Valuable Player (MVP) awards. 

2022–present: Ateneo–UP rivalry heightens

The COVID-19 pandemic halted all the remaining league tournaments in 2020, and the remainder of the season was cancelled on April 7 of that year. During the resumption of the UAAP Season 84 in 2022, however, both Ateneo and La Salle lost to the University of the Philippines Fighting Maroons in the men's basketball post-season rounds. UP swept La Salle in the eliminations before ousting them in their final game of their Final Four series. In addition, UP ended Ateneo's UAAP record of 39-game winning streak and their bid for a second consecutive season of elimination round sweep and stepladder finals berth, before dethroning them in their do-or-die match in the championship round and denying their bid for an unprecedented second streak of four consecutive UAAP championships. As a result, this marked the first time in UAAP history that an eventual champion team has defeated both Ateneo and La Salle in the post-season rounds in men's basketball in any single season.

In UAAP Season 85, La Salle and Ateneo split their elimination games. La Salle ended their 7-game losing streak to Ateneo in UAAP men's basketball dating from the Season 80 championship series in the first round of the eliminations before Ateneo won their head-to-head matchup in the second round of the eliminations. While both Ateneo and La Salle split their respective elimination records with the semifinal-bound UP Fighting Maroons and NU Bulldogs, Ateneo defeated UP in the second round of the eliminations to clinch the top seed while gain a twice-to-beat semifinal advantage for the sixth consecutive season—the longest overall streak in the Final Four era of UAAP men's basketball—after sweeping the Adamson Soaring Falcons due to quotient system in the eliminations. Meanwhile, La Salle was eliminated from semifinal contention after losing to Adamson in their playoff for the fourth seed. UP and Ateneo eventually ousted NU and Adamson, respectively, en route to their second consecutive (and third overall) joint UAAP men's basketball championship series appearance. Ateneo prevailed in three games to deny the UP Fighting Maroons their bid for an unprecedented double UAAP championship streak in a single calendar year, anchored by Ange Kouame, the first naturalized player in UAAP men's basketball history to win Rookie of the Year, and Season and Finals Most Valuable Player (MVP) awards.

Juniors' basketball rivalry
The two universities are also represented in the high school level, with the Ateneo de Manila High School (AHS) and La Salle's junior teams. La Salle's juniors' team was represented first by DLSC High School from 1924 to 1968, followed by La Salle Green Hills (LSGH) from 1969 up to 1981, and then De La Salle Zobel (DLSZ) from 1986 through the present. A similar rivalry, although on a much lesser scale, currently exists. When La Salle Green Hills used to be the juniors' team of the Green Archers in the NCAA, the rivalry between Ateneo and La Salle in the high school level was much stronger, considering that both the Ateneo de Manila High School and La Salle Green Hills are all-male schools, igniting a huge rumble in 1978. However, this rivalry has since faded with AHS transferring to the UAAP in 1978 and LSGH staying in the NCAA. Still, the remnants of this rivalry live on in the UAAP with LSGH's sister school De La Salle Zobel, the juniors representative of De La Salle University in the UAAP, taking its place.

In juniors' basketball, Ateneo has 11 NCAA titles and 19 UAAP titles, for a total of 30, whereas La Salle has 6 NCAA titles and 2 UAAP titles, for 8 in total. The De La Salle Greenies defeated the Ateneo Blue Eaglets in the 1939 NCAA Juniors Championship. Ateneo de Manila High School and De La Salle Zobel met twice in the UAAP juniors' basketball finals; in 2007 in which the Junior Archers swept the series in two games dethroning the Eaglets in the process, and in 2009 in which the Blue Eaglets won the best-of-three series, 2–1. In addition, the Junior Archers were not able to defend their 2005 championship due to their suspension along with their seniors' counterparts.

Philippine University Games
Ateneo has won the basketball crown of the Philippine University Games three times (2008, 2009, and 2011).  La Salle has won it once (1998).

National Seniors Open
The National Seniors Open was a tournament participated by top commercial (MICAA) and collegiate teams in the country. La Salle won the 1939 and 1949 Championships. Ateneo has not won a National Seniors Open championship.

National Open
The De La Salle Green Archers won the National Open in 1983.

PBA D-League
Both the Ateneo Blue Eagles and the De La Salle Green Archers have participated in the PBA D-League Aspirants' Cup as Cignal-Ateneo and EcoOil-La Salle, respectively. Ateneo won the championship in four games in 2019, while La Salle won the title in three games in 2022.

Filoil EcoOil Preseason Cup
In the Filoil EcoOil Preseason Cup, the Ateneo Blue Eagles have won the championship title twice, while the De La Salle Green Archers have won four times. The Blue Eagles won their first title in 2011 and their second in 2018. The Green Archers won the first two editions of the tournament in 2006 and 2007. They also won the championship in 2014 and 2016.

Men's basketball tournament results
Men's basketball games between the two in the UAAP are the most anticipated match-ups in the season, with most games being sold out. Both teams are guaranteed to face each other at the elimination round (regular season) twice, while they can meet for a maximum of three times in the playoffs (up to three times in the semifinals, or twice in the semifinals plus a seeding playoff).

The games were played consistently from 1986 until 2006 when La Salle was suspended for fielding two ineligible players.

Official UAAP league records since 1986 show that head-to-head championships between the teams have Ateneo leading 4 championships to 2.  Including regular season, Final Four and Championship games in the UAAP, Ateneo leads 55 games to 38 as seven La Salle wins from 2003 to 2005 were forfeited due to the use of ineligible players using falsified documents.

NCAA men's basketball results

UAAP men's basketball results

Final Four Rankings
For comparison, these are the rankings of these two teams since the Final Four format was introduced.

Seniors' division

Juniors' division 

a.La Salle admitted to have unknowingly fielded two ineligible players for the previous years from 2003 to 2005. However, the admission was made months after learning about the ineligibility. The UAAP Board forfeited their 2004–05 championship title and had to return their trophy. As a result, FEU was awarded the men's basketball championship for the 2004–05 season. The Green Archers' team standings from 2003 to 2005 were revoked and La Salle was suspended in the 2006–07 season from all UAAP events.

Volleyball

Overall 

In terms of total collegiate and high school volleyball titles won in the NCAA and UAAP, La Salle leads with 42 championships compared to Ateneo's 15 championships. In the seniors' division, La Salle leads Ateneo 18–9. La Salle was 4-peat NCAA men's champions from Seasons 53 to 56. The Green Spikers won their most recent UAAP titles in Seasons 64 and 66. The Lady Spikers were the first NCAA women's champions in volleyball when the tournament was introduced in NCAA Season 51 (1975–76) and have 11 UAAP titles. They are thrice 3-peat UAAP women's champions (2004–2006, 2011–2013, and 2016–2018), and hold the distinction of having the longest appearance in the UAAP Finals in the Final Four era, from Season 71 to Season 80 (2009–2018). La Salle is also the only women's volleyball team in UAAP history to both outright win the championship by winning all 14 elimination round games in a season (Season 67), and to have advanced outright to then-best-of-5 championship series with thrice-to-beat incentives by winning all 14 elimination round games in a season for at least 2 seasons (Season 74 and Season 76).

The Lady Eagles were back-to-back UAAP women's champions in Seasons 76 and 77, and won their third title in Season 81. The Lady Eagles became the first volleyball team in UAAP history to finish an entire season (including the finals) without a single loss (16–0) in the Season 77 women's volleyball tournament. The Blue Eagles were 3-peat UAAP  men's champions from Season 77 to Season 79 (2015–2017), the latter marking their perfect season in the men's volleyball tournament. Ateneo stands as the only member school in the UAAP to have scored 16–0 season win sweep records in both men's and women's divisions in collegiate volleyball.

The Ateneo Lady Eagles and the De La Salle Lady Spikers have met in the championships of the UAAP for six consecutive (and overall) times from Seasons 74 to 79 (2012–2017). The Lady Eagles won back-to-back titles over La Salle in 2014 and 2015, while the Lady Spikers prevailed back-to-back in 2012 and 2013, and 2016 and 2017. Since UAAP Season 72, both Ateneo and La Salle have qualified in the postseason of women's volleyball (semifinals onwards), marking the longest joint Final Four appearance by any two UAAP volleyball teams in the league's history. Also, since UAAP Season 71, either or both Ateneo and La Salle have competed in the championship series in UAAP collegiate volleyball.

In the juniors' division, La Salle has 24 championships while Ateneo has 6 (Ateneo does not have a girls' team in the juniors' division). The Blue Eaglet Spikers won championship titles in NCAA Seasons 43, 45, and 48, and were 3-peat champions from Seasons 50 to 52. The De La Salle Junior Spikers won 7 championship titles under their membership stint in the NCAA which included a 4-peat championship streak along with the Green Spikers from Seasons 53 to 56. In the UAAP, they were 6-peat champions in the boys' division from Seasons 57 to 62, and have also won the title in Season 66. The Junior Lady Spikers were 5-peat champions from UAAP Seasons 57 to 61, and were 3-peat champions from Seasons 73 to 75. They also won additional titles in UAAP Seasons 65 and 81.

UAAP 
UAAP Season 74 Women's Volleyball Finals

For the first time in UAAP history, Ateneo and La Salle met each other at the UAAP Season 74 women's volleyball finals. The De La Salle Lady Spikers became the first volleyball team ever to automatically enter the UAAP Finals with a thrice-to-beat advantage after sweeping the elimination round. On the other hand, the Ateneo Lady Eagles, consistently ranked second throughout much of the elimination round (with losses to La Salle, twice, and UST in the second round), defeated the third-seeded (and previous season's runner-up) UST Tigresses in the semifinals in four sets. This marks Ateneo's first entry to the UAAP volleyball finals since the school's 1978 admission into the UAAP.

Game One of the Finals was won by Ateneo in four sets, 23–25, 28–26, 25–23, 25–17, marking the first recorded Ateneo victory in any UAAP volleyball championship series while halting then-league record of 24 consecutive wins by La Salle (dating back from Season 73). La Salle went on to recover in Game Two in four sets, 23–25, 25–21, 26–24, 25–18, before sweeping Ateneo in Game Three, 25–16, 25–22, 25–13, to finish off the series in three games and win their second consecutive (and seventh overall) UAAP women's volleyball championship title. Abigail Maraño of La Salle was named as Most Valuable Player (MVP) of the Season, while then-graduating La Salle team captain Charleen Cruz is currently the only women's volleyball player in UAAP history to win multiple and consecutive Finals Most Valuable Player (MVP) awards.

UAAP Season 75 Women's Volleyball Finals

Ateneo and La Salle faced each other once again during the UAAP Season 75 women's volleyball finals after the De La Salle Lady Spikers defeated the NU Lady Bulldogs (in the latter's first ever Final Four placement in UAAP women's volleyball) and the Ateneo Lady Eagles defeated the Adamson Lady Falcons during the Final Four matches, both in straight sets, that were held at the Smart Araneta Coliseum on February 23, 2013. The UAAP Season 75 marked the first time ever that the league's Final Four and championship volleyball matches were played at the Smart Araneta Coliseum and the Mall of Asia Arena.

Game One of the Finals was played before a crowd of 17,342 at the Smart Araneta Coliseum on March 2, 2013. The Lady Spikers posed a comeback win over the Lady Eagles in five sets, 20–25, 17–25, 25–22, 25–22, 15–6. La Salle eventually swept Ateneo in Game Two, 25–23, 25–20, 25–16, in front of 18,779 people at the Mall of Asia Arena, to finish the series in two games and win their eighth UAAP women's volleyball championship title (and their second three-peat championship streak). La Salle team captain Abigail Maraño and teammate Victonara Galang became the first pair of volleyball players in UAAP history to be named co-Most Valuable Players (MVPs) of the Season, while then-graduating La Salle player Michele Gumabao was named the Most Valuable Player (MVP) of the Finals.

UAAP Season 76 Women's Volleyball Finals

For the third time, Ateneo and La Salle faced each other during UAAP Season 76 women's volleyball finals. The De La Salle Lady Spikers became the first volleyball team ever to enter the UAAP Finals with a thrice-to-beat advantage after sweeping the elimination round for a second overall season. On the other hand, the Ateneo Lady Eagles, under new head coach Anusorn "Tai" Bundit, were able to reach their third consecutive finals after winning three consecutive knockout matches against fourth-seeded Adamson Lady Falcons and then second-seeded, twice-to-beat NU Lady Bulldogs under the stepladder format.

Game One of the Finals, which was held on March 5, 2014, was won by Ateneo in four sets, 17–25, 25–23, 25–13, 25–20, marking their first win against La Salle in the entire season (and their only second win against La Salle in their entire joint UAAP women's volleyball finals appearances) while ending a still-standing league record of 30 consecutive wins by La Salle in UAAP women's volleyball history (dating back from the second game of the eliminations in Season 75). Three days later, on March 8, 2014, La Salle bounced back in Game Two and defeated Ateneo in four sets, 25–14, 25–20, 19–25, 26–24. The first two games of the Finals were held at the Smart Araneta Coliseum.

The venue of the remaining games of the Finals shifted to the Mall of Asia Arena. In Game Three, which was held on March 12, 2014, Ateneo defeated La Salle in five sets in front of the 18,095-strong crowd, 25–21, 25–23, 18–25, 16–25, 17–15, to force a winner-take-all title match on March 15, 2014. As a result, the UAAP Season 76 women's volleyball finals series became the league's longest volleyball championship series, and is, to date, the only one to last up to four games (in a best-of-five finals series format with a 1–0 advantage for any team). In Game Four, the Ateneo Lady Eagles swept the De La Salle Lady Spikers, 25–23, 26–24, 25–21, to deny La Salle's second overall four-peat championship bid and become the lowest-seeded volleyball team to ever win a UAAP volleyball championship title (Ateneo's maiden title) at the Mall of Asia Arena after a 21,314-strong audience.

Ateneo's team captain Alyssa Valdez became the first volleyball player in UAAP history to win both awards of the Most Valuable Player (MVP) of the Season and of the Finals, and the first UAAP athlete to win at least four awards in a single season (including awards for the Season's Best Scorer and Best Server categories).

UAAP Season 77 Women's Volleyball Finals

For the fourth time, Ateneo and La Salle faced each other during UAAP Season 77 women's volleyball finals. For the first time in UAAP history, the Ateneo Lady Eagles defeated the De La Salle Lady Spikers twice during the elimination rounds, and entered the finals with the thrice-to-beat advantage after amassing a 14–0 eliminations sweeps record. On the other hand, the second-seeded De La Salle Lady Spikers suffered their first defeat from a non-Ateneo team in the tournament (since UST Tigresses' shocking five-set season-opening win against DLSU in Season 75) during Game One against the third-seeded NU Lady Bulldogs in the semifinals (in straight sets), but recovered in Game Two in four sets at the expense of then La Salle's team captain Victonara Galang's post-season injury (which sidelined her from playing for Season 77 Finals).

Game One of the Finals, which was held on March 11, 2015 at the Smart Araneta Coliseum in front of 18,363 fans, was won by Ateneo in straight sets, 25–18, 25–19, 25–19. Three days later, on March 14, 2015, watched by 20,705 fans at the Mall of Asia Arena, Ateneo swept La Salle again in straight sets, 25–22, 25–17, 25–23, becoming the league's first ever overall volleyball varsity team to achieve a 16–0 perfect season (eliminations round up to the championship series) record and defeated La Salle for the second consecutive season to win the UAAP Season 77 volleyball championship title. Ateneo team captain Alyssa Valdez was named back-to-back Most Valuable Player (MVP) of the Season, while Amy Ahomiro won the award as the Most Valuable Player (MVP) of the Finals.

UAAP Season 78 Women's Volleyball Finals

For the fifth time, Ateneo and La Salle faced each other during UAAP Season 78 women's volleyball finals. During the first round of the eliminations, the eventually second-seeded DLSU Lady Spikers swept the season's top-seeded ADMU Lady Eagles in three straight sets (with La Salle dealing Ateneo's first single game loss after still-standing league record of 24 consecutive wins and since winning their maiden UAAP women's volleyball title in Season 76) to deny them a sweep of the elimination round and revert the tournament to a Regular Final Four format for the first time since Season 75. In the second round, however, Ateneo recovered in a five-set comeback win to seal their top-seed position.

After the eliminations, the Ateneo Lady Eagles swept the UP Lady Maroons during their comeback Final Four appearance after 13 years in three straight sets in the semifinals in a return trip to the finals for fifth consecutive UAAP Finals appearance, while the De La Salle Lady Spikers recovered from a shocking five-set loss in Game 1 of their Final Four match-up against the third-seeded FEU Lady Tamaraws to sweep their opponents in do-or-die Game 2 and book their eighth consecutive UAAP Finals appearance.

The UAAP Season 78 women's volleyball finals became the first championship series since the DLSU–FEU match-up in Season 71 to last up to three games under such tournament division (in a best-of-three finals series format). Game One of the Finals, which was held on April 23, 2016 and watched by 19,921 fans at the Smart Araneta Coliseum, was won by La Salle in straight sets, 25–22, 25–22, 25–21. Four days later, on April 27, 2016, Ateneo posed a come-from-behind win against La Salle in Game Two in five sets, 18–25, 26–28, 25–17, 25–16, 15–11, in front of the 20,541-strong crowd at the Mall of Asia Arena to force a winner-take-all match on April 30, 2016. La Salle, however, recovered in four sets, 19–25, 25–21, 25–16, 25–16 in Game Three to deny Ateneo's three-peat championship bid and win their ninth overall UAAP women's volleyball championship title (and first since Season 75) in front of a record 22,858-strong crowd at the Smart Araneta Coliseum.

Graduating Ateneo Lady Eagles' team captain Alyssa Valdez earned her third straight award for Most Valuable Player (MVP) of the Season, becoming the first UAAP women's volleyball athlete to earn three consecutive MVP awards since Monica Aleta from FEU from Seasons 63 to 65, and the first volleyball athlete in UAAP history to win at least four overall Most Valuable Player (MVP) awards. Meanwhile, Kim Kianna Dy of the De La Salle Lady Spikers was hailed as the Most Valuable Player (MVP) of the Finals.

UAAP Season 79 Women's Volleyball Finals

For the sixth time, Ateneo and La Salle faced each other during UAAP Season 79 women's volleyball finals. During the first round of eliminations, the defending champions (and eventually second-seeded) De La Salle Lady Spikers suffered a shock straight sets loss to the UP Lady Maroons but recovered in the second round of eliminations against the same team with another straight sets victory. Meanwhile, the Ateneo Lady Eagles suffered losses only to the NU Lady Bulldogs twice in the elimination rounds but swept the De La Salle Lady Spikers in the elimination rounds to secure the top seed for this season.

In the semifinal round, the De La Salle Lady Spikers won over the third-seeded UST Tigresses during the latter's comeback Final Four appearance after 5 years in four sets to book their ninth consecutive UAAP Finals appearance, while the Ateneo Lady Eagles also won against the fourth-seeded FEU Lady Tamaraws in four sets to book their sixth consecutive UAAP Finals appearance. This marked the longest streak of joint UAAP Finals appearances by any two women's volleyball teams in the league's history.

Game One of the Finals was held at the Smart Araneta Coliseum on May 2, 2017 in front of 13,468 fans. The De La Salle Lady Spikers recorded their first victory against Ateneo Lady Eagles during this game for this season in four sets, 21–25, 29–27, 25–22 and 25–20. Game Two of the Finals was held again at the Smart Araneta Coliseum on May 6, 2017 in front of 20,860 fans. The De La Salle Lady Spikers won against the Ateneo Lady Eagles in five sets, 19–25, 25–14, 18–25, 25–18 and 15–10, to sweep the series in two games and earn their second consecutive (and tenth overall) UAAP women's volleyball title.

La Salle players Mary Joy Baron and Desiree Cheng were named as Most Valuable Player (MVP) of the Season and of the Finals, respectively.

UAAP Seasons 80 and 81 Women's Volleyball

Season 79 would eventually be the last of the string of six consecutive Ateneo–La Salle match-ups in the UAAP women's volleyball finals dating back from Season 74. The Lady Eagles, after losing twice to the De La Salle Lady Spikers, FEU Lady Tamaraws and NU Lady Bulldogs in the first round, and to the UP Lady Maroons in the second round of the eliminations, were booted out from finals contention in Season 80 as the third-seeded team by that season's hosting school and second-seeded team FEU Lady Tamaraws in four sets. This marked the first time that Ateneo lost in the Final Four with a twice-to-beat disadvantage since their Final Four showdown against La Salle in Season 73.

Meanwhile, the top-seeded De La Salle Lady Spikers, after losing only to both the Adamson Lady Falcons and NU Lady Bulldogs in the first round of the eliminations, swept the fourth-seeded NU Lady Bulldogs in their Final Four match-up to pose their tenth consecutive UAAP Finals appearance in 2018. La Salle would eventually sweep FEU in the finals (in the first consecutive UAAP women's volleyball finals sweep records since collegiate volleyball's shift to second semester in the UAAP annual calendar in Season 69) to win their eleventh UAAP women's volleyball title (and their third three-peat championship streak, the most in UAAP history) in 2018. Then-graduating La Salle player Dawn Macandili became the first volleyball libero in UAAP history to win the award for Most Valuable Player (MVP) of the Finals.

In Season 81, however, La Salle lost back-to-back games against the UP Lady Maroons and UST Golden Tigresses in the first round of the eliminations (marking their first back-to-back elimination round losses since the forfeiture of their wins in Season 70 due to eligibility issues), and lost back-to-back games against the FEU Lady Tamaraws in the last game of the eliminations, and the second-seed playoff (and twice-to-beat semifinal incentive) to UST (marking their first back-to-back losses between the elimination rounds and the post-season playoffs since Season 77). La Salle was eventually dethroned in their Final Four match-up against UST the same year, ending their third overall bid for four straight championships and still-standing league record of decade-long appearance in the UAAP Finals. This season marked the first time that no green-colored school has competed in the UAAP women's volleyball finals in the 21st century, and the first time that the defending UAAP women's volleyball champions have been dethroned in the season outside the championship series since FEU's Final Four ousting of UST (and eventual overall title win) in Season 70.

Meanwhile, the top-seeded Ateneo Lady Eagles, after losing only to La Salle twice in the elimination rounds, won in their third consecutive year of Final Four match-up against fourth-seeded FEU (after erasing Ateneo's twice-to-beat incentive in the opening match of their semifinal showdown) to pose their return to the finals (their seventh overall) after missing the cut in the previous year. This marked the first time since Season 69 that both of the previous season's finalists were eliminated before the UAAP women's volleyball championship round. The Lady Eagles went on to win the finals against UST, 2–1, in the first ever Ateneo–UST UAAP volleyball finals showdown, to claim their third (overall) women's volleyball title (and their first since Season 77). This marked the first time that the eventual UAAP women's volleyball champions overcame a finals series game deficit to win the title since Season 76. Then-graduating team captains Cherry Ann Rondina of UST and Bea de Leon of Ateneo were hailed the Most Valuable Player (MVP) awards of the Season and Finals, respectively.

UAAP Seasons 82 and 84 Women's Volleyball

Ateneo's UAAP women's volleyball title defense campaign, however, was postponed due to the COVID-19 pandemic that halted all remaining league tournaments in 2020. The first and only Ateneo–La Salle women's volleyball game which La Salle won in four sets, became the UAAP's last match to be held (and the last major sporting event broadcast live in the Philippines) in the same year. The remainder of Season 82 was officially cancelled on April 7, 2020. 

La Salle would later on repeat the same victory against Ateneo in the first round of the eliminations in the post-pandemic resumption of the UAAP tournaments in 2022 to extend their head-to-head winning streak since their finals sweep in Season 79. In the second game of the tournament, La Salle would win in five sets to sweep Ateneo in the elimination round. During the eliminations, Ateneo and La Salle were swept by the NU Lady Bulldogs and split their win-loss records with the UST Golden Tigresses and Adamson Lady Falcons. La Salle would later on grab the second seed and twice-to-beat advantage in the stepladder playoffs after National University advanced outright to the UAAP Finals, while fourth-seeded Ateneo ousted Adamson and UST in consecutive games to become the lowest-seeded Final Four team in UAAP women's volleyball history to complete a podium finish after setting up the only second Ateneo–La Salle semifinals series in the same division. La Salle dethroned Ateneo via sweep in the stepladder semifinals to pose their return to the UAAP Finals, marking the first time in the Final Four era of UAAP women's volleyball that both preceding season's finalists were ousted from the championship round for consecutive seasons. 

La Salle eventually lost to the NU Lady Bulldogs via series sweep as the Lady Bulldogs went on to win their first championship in 65 years. National University became the first non-Ateneo and non-La Salle team to complete a sweep in UAAP women's volleyball, following the La Salle team in 2004 (Season 67) that went 14–0, and the Ateneo team in 2015 (Season 77) which became the first team to go 16–0 in a tournament. Consequently, this season marked the first time in UAAP women's volleyball history that both Ateneo and La Salle lost in all the races of Rookie of the Year, Season and Finals Most Valuable Player (MVP) awards, as NU clinched these accolades courtesy of Mhicaela Belen, the league's first collegiate volleyball player ever to sweep the Rookie of the Year, Most Valuable Player (MVP) and tournament championship awards in the same year, and team captain Princess Anne Robles.

Women's volleyball tournament results

The rivalry started to gain recognition in UAAP Season 74 when both teams met in the Finals for the first time. Head-to-head championships between the teams have La Salle leading 4 championships to 2. The Ateneo Lady Eagles and the De La Salle Lady Spikers have fought in the UAAP Finals for six (6) consecutive times from Seasons 74 to 79 (2012–2017), where the Lady Eagles won in 2014 and 2015 while the Lady Spikers won in 2012, 2013, 2016, and 2017.

UAAP women's volleyball results

Other sports
Both schools have also competed in various sports including badminton, baseball, chess, football (soccer), judo, softball, swimming, taekwondo and poomsae, tennis, table tennis, as well as track and field during various periods of the NCAA and UAAP.

Football (soccer)
Football, the most popular sport in the world, was also reported to be the top sport in the Philippines from the 1920s, 1930s, and shortly after World War II. In terms of the total number of collegiate and high school titles in the NCAA and UAAP combined La Salle leads Ateneo 67–19.

La Salle has the most number of collegiate championships in NCAA history with 21 versus Ateneo with 6. The De La Salle Green Booters were 9-peat champions from 1932 through 1940. In the UAAP, La Salle also leads with a combined 15 titles, made up of 4 men's titles and 11 women's titles, versus Ateneo's 8 men's titles. The Green Booters were back-to-back champions in UAAP Seasons 59 and 60, while the Lady Booters were 4-peat champions in UAAP Seasons 65 to 68, and 3-peat champions in UAAP Seasons 79 to 81. The Ateneo Lady Eagles have yet to win a title, while the Blue Eagles were 3-peat champions in UAAP Seasons 66 to 68, and won its most recent title in UAAP Season 81.

In the NCAA juniors division, La Salle has 30 titles versus Ateneo's 3 titles. The De La Salle Junior Archers were twice 5-peat champions from 1937 through 1941 and 1971 through 1976. In the UAAP, the Ateneo Blue Eaglets have 2 titles while the De La Salle Junior Archers have 1 title. In the inaugural UAAP Juniors Football Championship in 2007–08, De La Salle Zobel won the demonstration championship. Ateneo won the demonstration championship the following year. In 2009–10, Ateneo won the first official UAAP Juniors Football Championship.

For the De La Salle Zobel boys' football team, they have maintained 5 years of high school football championships in the RIFA cup 1 and 2 where Ateneo was not successful in winning any match against De La Salle Zobel which totaled 9 championship titles from 2001 to 2005. From 2001 to 2005, De La Salle Zobel were RIFA 1 and 2 champions 9 times, most of them back to back champions in every year. The only loss De La Salle Zobel encountered was a loss to Xavier high school during the RIFA 2 championship in 2004.

Badminton

Ateneo has 12 titles whereas La Salle has 6 in terms of total seniors' badminton collegiate championships. The last men's badminton crown for La Salle came in 2007 and for Ateneo in 2013. Ateneo also won championship titles in 1995, 1996, 2001, 2003, and 2011. In women's badminton, La Salle won in 2002, 2004, 2005, 2009, and 2017. Ateneo won in 2003, 2012, 2013, 2018, 2019, and 2022.

Taekwondo and Poomsae

In another popular collegiate sport, taekwondo, La Salle has 9 collegiate titles whereas Ateneo has no titles to date. In the juniors' division, Ateneo were 3-peat champions from UAAP Seasons 62 to 64. In poomsae, Ateneo has yet to win a title, whereas La Salle has 3 championships.

Judo

In judo, Ateneo has the upper hand with 8 collegiate titles while La Salle has 2. La Salle's men's team won their first title in 1992 while the women's team won their first title in 2013 which ended La Salle's 21-year title drought. La Salle almost won their first Judo championships in Season 71 with 3 gold medals and the Ateneo with 2. Ateneo was able to clinch championships with bronze medals that boosted them to the overall championship. Ateneo also won the men's title in UAAP Season 78, and was declared co-champion in UAAP Season 80 with UST. In the juniors' division, Ateneo has 9 championships while La Salle has yet to win a title.

Swimming

In collegiate swimming, La Salle has 17 titles versus Ateneo with 14 titles. La Salle was twice 3-peat champion in the men's division in UAAP Seasons 53 to 55 and Seasons 63 to 65. La Salle was also back-to-back champions in the women's division in UAAP Seasons 65 and 66. In UAAP Season 85, the DLSU Lady Tankers ended their 19-year championship drought. Ateneo has won seven consecutive championships in the men's division in UAAP Seasons 77 to 85, and won three consecutive titles in the women's division in UAAP Seasons 80 to 82. In the juniors' division, La Salle has 9 NCAA titles and 4 UAAP titles for a total of 13 championship titles, while Ateneo won all 12 of its championship titles in the UAAP.

Baseball

In collegiate baseball, Ateneo leads La Salle 6–5. Prior to Ateneo's 10-year curse, in 1991, La Salle lost to Ateneo 10–5 for Ateneo's last victory before the infamous losing streak. It took 13 years before Ateneo could beat La Salle when in 2004, Johnel Clemente's game-winning RBI single off La Salle pitcher Angel Gabriel nailed Ateneo's victory, 9–8. In 2006, Ateneo handed La Salle its first humiliating 10-run loss, 17–7, on Jonathan Sibal's 2-RBI single off pitcher Jeff Ardio which ended the game prematurely at the 8th inning (mercy rule). La Salle actually led 7–4 in the 4th inning before Ateneo exploded for 9 runs and put the game out of reach. In 2009, Ateneo and La Salle combined for what may be the highest scoring game in UAAP Baseball history when Ateneo defeated La Salle, 27–14. In UAAP Season 78, La Salle ended their 13-year title drought and dethroned Ateneo, who were the defending three-time champions. Both teams would meet again in the UAAP Season 81 Finals, where La Salle won their fifth championship title after defeating Ateneo in Game 3, 11–9. In the juniors' division, Ateneo has 2 NCAA titles and 3 UAAP titles for a total of 5 championship titles, while La Salle won all 4 of its championship titles in the UAAP.

Trivia
Due to the numerous socialites watching the games live, La Salle head coach Franz Pumaren mentioned that "The janitors in the Araneta Coliseum would often say if there's an Ateneo–La Salle game, once everybody's out of the Coliseum, it still smells good because of all the socialites watching." In the late 1990s, former first daughter and actress Kris Aquino would call Ateneo head coach Joe Lipa to check on the team's progress, according to Ricky Dandan, Lipa's former assistant coach. Joel Banal, Ateneo's head coach from 2002 to 2003, used to have nightmares about La Salle's dreaded press, and considers the 2002 championship as his greatest accomplishment, after which Ateneo alums would pay for his restaurant bills. Moreover, Ateneo alumni installed the playing floor on the 2000 NBA All-Star Game to the Moro Lorenzo Sports Center, while ICTSI international shipping port magnate and Lasallian billionaire Enrique Razon, Jr. donated US$1 million to refurbish De La Salle's sporting facilities at his Enrique M. Razon Sports Center.

Former DLSU Green Archers Basketball head team manager and financier, Eduardo Cojuangco Jr. of San Miguel Corporation, on his 78th birthday celebration in 2013 gave a ₱250 million check to the Brother President of DLSU. Boxing Coach Freddie Roach, world-renowned trainer of eight-division boxing champion Manny Pacquiao, was in attendance and gave full support to the De La Salle Green Archers that battled against the Ateneo Blue Eagles on the first elimination round match-up between the two teams in UAAP Season 79. Asked about his support of La Salle, Roach said: "I like Notre Dame, I like Irish. I like green. I met the Green Archers yesterday (Saturday). I met the players and the coaches and I like them."

During the collegiate games between both schools, televised coverage would occasionally flash famous and notable alumni from entertainment, politics, business, education, and other fields watching and cheering from the sidelines. Former Ateneo cheerleader and current Senator Richard Gordon is renowned for sideline antics like jumping on the scorer's table to rile up the crowd. Gary Valenciano and Ogie Alcasid two notable LSGH Kundirana and DLSU alumni entertained the crowds during the UAAP Season 73 opening ceremonies hosted by DLSU for their university's 2011 centennial celebration. Actress Angelica Panganiban is known for attending the games of the Ateneo Lady Eagles, while female comedian Ai-Ai delas Alas has shown support for the De La Salle Lady Spikers. Orlando Magic player Gilbert Arenas described the Ateneo–La Salle game as "Their college game would be like if it was Duke and Maryland playing each other and you split the crowd in half, 50-50. One side of their gym was blue and one side of their gym was green and everybody was just yelling."

See also
La Salle–UST rivalry
UP–UST rivalry
San Beda–Letran rivalry
San Sebastian–Letran rivalry
Carolina–Duke rivalry

References

University Athletic Association of the Philippines rivalries
Ateneo de Manila University
De La Salle University